The 1904–05 season was the 6th season in the existence of Juventus. Juventus won their first league in their history.

Competitions

Prima categoria

Regional preliminary round

Final round

References

Juventus F.C. seasons
Italian football championship-winning seasons